The Doghmush (pronounced "Doe-moosh" or "Durmush", see spelling) are a Palestinian family from the Gaza Strip.

Johnston kidnapping
The family became known internationally in 2007 as they proclaimed themselves as the Jaysh al-Islām (Army of Islam), and being behind the kidnapping and holding of the British journalist Alan Johnston for four months in 2007. The family has reportedly been involved in extortion, smuggling, arms dealing and the killing of rivals. The clan has been dubbed "The Sopranos of Gaza City". They are linked to the British-based Palestinian-Jordanian extremist Abu Qatada.

Spelling
The family originally came to Gaza from Turkey in the early 20th century and as a result their name is also spelled using current Turkish orthography as Doğmuş, pronounced "Doe-moosh", which means "born" using the inferential or dubitative past tense. Other possible spellings are Dogmosh, Dugmash, Dagmoush, Dughmush, Dogmush, Durmush and Dormush.

External links
Article about Doghmush clan

References 

Palestinian families
Palestinian people of Turkish descent
Turkish families
Culture of the Gaza Strip
Crime in the State of Palestine
Crime families